Estique-Pampa District is one of eight districts of the province Tarata in Peru.

References